Böhler, Bohler, and Boehler is a surname, and may refer to;

Bruce Boehler (1917–1987), American professional basketball player
George Boehler (1892–1958), American professional baseball player
Britta Böhler (born 1960), German lawyer, member of the Dutch Senate for the GreenLeft Party
Fred Bohler (1885–1960), American athlete, coach, and administrator
George Bohler (1887–1968), American football, basketball, and baseball coach
Henry Cabot Lodge Bohler (1925–2007), American airman and civil-rights activist
Jochen Böhler (born 1969), German historian  
Lorenz Böhler (1885–1973), Austrian physician 
Otto Böhler (1847–1913), Austrian silhouette artist
Peter Böhler (1712–1775,) German Moravian missionary 
Reinhard Böhler (1945–1995), German motorcyclist
Roy Bohler, American football, basketball, and baseball coach
Stefanie Böhler (born 1981), German skier

See also
Bohler Canyon
Boehlert